CBoys TV is an American motorsports and comedy YouTube group headquartered on Cormorant Lake (Minnesota) United States. The "C" in CBoys stands for "Cormorant" and the groups motto is "Life Wide Open" In 2021 the Group passed 1 million subscribers on YouTube. The group consists of CJ Lotzer, Ryan Iwerks, Grant (Ken) Matthees, Ben Roth, Micah Sandman, and  Evan Sheff . The CBoys ran into legal trouble in 2019 when they jumped a jetski]] from one body of water to another, and again when they were drifting and racing on a lake near cormorant. The lake incident resulted from a DNR officer seeing a post on the CBoys Instagram account showing the activity. The officer issued a reckless driving ticket.  The Minnesota DNR issued two citations, the equivalent of traffic tickets, to Jake Sherbrooke.

Members
In 2020 it was announced that Jake Sherbrooke had left the CBoysTV group to start his own channel. In a video explaining the decision Sherbrooke said that he had left because he felt like he did not have a purpose in the group other than doing dangerous stunts. Sherbrooke wished the group the best and said he was happy for their success. Sherbrooke has gone on to create his own channel amassing 236,000 subscribers. The channel is called "Jake Sherbrooke". As of 2022 there have been crossover videos with Sherbrooke and the CBoysTV.

Current
 CJ Lotzer – (2016–Present)
 Ryan Iwerks – (2016–Present)
 Ken Matthees – (2016–Present)
 Ben Roth – (2016–Present)
 Micah Sandman – (2016–Present)
 Evan Sheff - (2022-present)

Former
 Jake Sherbrooke – (2016–2020)
 Justin Hanson - (2016-2018)

Fleet of motor vehicles

Current

 Tri Zinger [with tracks]
 Golf Cart
 Polaris RZR
 Volkswagen Golf Cabriolet
 Skid Loader
 BMW 6 Series Convertible
 Honda CRF 450 trike
 Mitsubishi Evo X
 YFZ 450
 KTM 450 Snow Bike
 CRF 250r
 KTM 300 sx
 (2) YZ 250f
 (2) FORD RAPTORS
 V8 Hummer
 (2) Sea Doo Spark Trixx

Former

 Modified Chevrolet Aveo converted to be a V8 Monster Truck
Jeep Grand Cherokee SRT
 Snowmobile Fourwheeler
 Jet Ski
Polaris RS1
3 Ford Rangers
 Dodge Dakota
3 Smart Cars

Future
Tesla Cybertruck

Associated channels
CboysTV Clips
Erased Products
life wide open with Cboystv (podcast)
Life wide open with Cboystv podcast clips.

Clothing and apparel
CBoys TV produces clothing in apparel sold on their website and app. The group also sells motorsports parts on their site Wide Open Parts.

References

YouTube channels launched in 2015